Bryan Flannery (born December 24, 1967) is an American politician who served as a member of the Ohio House of Representatives from 1999 to 2002. He was also a Democratic candidate for the 2006 Ohio gubernatorial election, losing to eventual winner Ted Strickland.

Early life and education 
Flannery was born in Lakewood, Ohio. Flannery's grandfather, Joseph E. Flannery, served as a member of the Cleveland City Council. His father, James Flannery, was a member of the Ohio House of Representatives from 1966 to 1972. Flannery was an all-Ohio tackle at St. Edward High School and also played on the 1988 Notre Dame Fighting Irish football team. Flannery earned a Bachelor of Arts degree from the University of Notre Dame.

Career 
Flannery has worked in the oil, healthcare, and insurance industries. He also served as a member of the Lakewood City Council from 1994 to 1998. He was elected to the Ohio House of Representatives in November 1998 and assumed office in early-1999. Flannery served until 2002 and left office after redistricting. Flannery was the Democratic nominee for Ohio secretary of state, losing to incumbent Ken Blackwell. He was also a Democratic candidate for the 2006 Ohio gubernatorial election, losing to eventual winner Ted Strickland.

Flannery is a Democratic candidate for the 2021 Ohio's 11th congressional district special election. On March 4, 2021, Flannery participated in a virtual candidate forum hosted by the Jewish Democratic Council of America.

References

External links
 Campaign website

Living people
21st-century American politicians
Notre Dame College of Arts and Letters alumni
1967 births
People from Lakewood, Ohio
Democratic Party members of the Ohio House of Representatives
Candidates in the 2021 United States elections